Peter Horn may refer to:

 Peter Horn (poet) (1934–2019), South African poet
 Peter Horn (pilot) (1915–1983), Danish fighter pilot
 Peter Horn (politician) (1891–1967), German politician